Gesang (also Desa Gesang, or Gesang Village) is a small town located the Tempeh subdistrict of East Java, approximately 30 minutes drives from Lumajang  and 4 hours from Surabaya.  It borders the towns of Jokarto (North), Pulo (East), Jatisari (South East), Semumu (South) and Nguter (West).

Demography

According to a 2008 census, there are 5591 people living in Gesang, 2800 males and 2791 females.  Gesang is divided into 5 Dusun (village sub-districts); Dusun Putuk (highest place), Dusun Kebonan (previously Kebon Sari, most beautiful place), Dusun Darungan (temporary visitors), Dusun Krajan (crowded place) I and Dusun Krajan II.
Gesang consists of 5  Rukun Warga (RW) and 42 Rukun Tetangga (RT).
99% of the population are Moslem although a very small percent of Christians have homes in Gesang and there is a church.

History
In 1243, some of the Mataram kingdom set up Nusa Barong Island, Puger under the leadership of Patih Danurejo. They were ordered to search for an heirloom of the kingdom, which had been stolen by Ratu Pantai Selatan (The Queen of the Southern Ocean).
As the king of Blambangan knew that some of the Mataram people were staying within his kingdom. He ordered them to leave Nusa Barong Island. Feeling defeated, the remaining warriors ran away to the valley of Semeru mountain (which us now known as Tumpeng village). In the village they met an elder called ‘Mbah Tuan’. He suggested that they make a “Kauripan” (life), for themselves on the east of the Tumpeng village.
Then the Mataram people chose to live in Watu Dakon (which is now Dusun Krajan 1). They could make a life for themselves there.

In 1924, under Dutch colonialism, the first Kepala Desa Gesang was chosen, Bapak Taman Wirorejo. Bapak Taman Wirorejo, who also changed the name of the village to Gesang. The word comes from the word Pagesangan (similar to Kahuripan (life)).
 Taman Wirorejo		1924-1939
 Danurejo		        1940-1945
 Amaru			        1946-1949
 Surahmad Wd		        1950-1966
 Buwang			1967-1968
 Surahmad		        1969-1992
 Sukamtono		        1992-1997
 Bambang Bigyanto	        1997-2002
 Sukamtono		        2000-2007
 A. Baidowi Ridwan, SH   	2007-now

Education
Primary education is easily accessible in Gesang. The village is home to two Sekolah Dasar (SD) – primary schools – which provide early childhood education to those aged 5 to 11. SD Negeri 1 Gesang is located on the village’s main thoroughfare, Jalan Raya Gesang, while SD Negeri 2 Gesang is situated behind the Balai Desa, or town hall.
Students attending Junior/Senior/Vocational  High school – known as SMP (Sekolah Menengah Pertama), SMA (Sekolah Menengah Atas), SMK (Sekolah Menengah Kejuruan) respectively – travel the short distance to neighbouring villages; Pulo and Tempeh. Alternatively, students may attend either of the two SMA in Lumajang for their final three years of schooling.
In addition to primary and secondary schooling, children may enrol in Kindergarten – Taman Kanak-Kanak (TK) – which is housed adjacent to SDN 2 Gesang.
For special needs children, a Sekolah Luar Biasa (SLB), is also available in Gesang, located on Jalan Sutono (Sutono Street).  This school was renovated as part of the Australia-Indonesia Youth Exchange Program 2009/09.  The SLB caters for all students who have learning disabilities, which might mean that they don’t get the proper attention and care needed in a regular school.  This means that students with disabilities, ranging from deafness through to those that suffer from genetic disorders, such as down syndrome.

Health
Gesang has a Puskesmas (Pusat Kesehatan Masyarakat - Community Health Centre) in the centre of the village. The centre's staff includes a doctor, a dentist, a nurse and a midwife.
A pharmacy for prescription drugs is also located within the Puskesmas. The staff at the Puskesmas run community centred programs aimed at improving the health of the town using social cohesion. There is a particular focus on the health of women and children, with special clinics being run to target key issues such as nutrition, physical health and mental development, and basic sanitation.
The centre is also initiating a campaign to improve the sanitation in the village to prevent the occurrence and transmission of communicable disease. Additionally there is a continuous mosquito surveillance program, aimed at assessing and decreasing the incidence of dengue fever in the local area.
Also separate from the Puskesmas, there are several sporting initiatives such as soccer, volleyball and aerobics, aimed at getting members of different demographics physically active.

Economy

The majority of the population are involved in farming and agriculture (mostly subsistence).  The main crops are rice, corn, beans and legumes, sugar and cassava.  A significant number of people (mostly males) are also employed in the local jewellery industry, which produces hand made jewelry made from gold and silver, most of which is sold to tourists in Bali.  Sales of jewelry have been affected in recent years by the 2002 and 2005 Bali bombings, and then more recently by the global financial downturn.

References

External links
 

Populated places in East Java